Olena Ivanivna Ronzhyna-Morozova (born 18 November 1970 in Dnipropetrovsk) is a retired rower from Ukraine, who won a silver medal at the 1996 Summer Olympics. She is a four-time Olympian.

Ronzhyna competed for the Unified Team at the 1992 Summer Olympics. She was a member of the Ukrainian team at the 1996 Summer Olympics in Atlanta, winning a silver medal in the women's quadruple sculls with teammates Inna Frolova, Svitlana Maziy, and Dina Miftakhutdynova. At her last Olympic appearance in 2004, she was disqualified with her team after one of her teammates, Olena Olefirenko, tested positive for ethamivan.

References
 

1970 births
Living people
Soviet female rowers
Ukrainian female rowers
Olympic rowers of Ukraine
Olympic rowers of the Unified Team
Rowers at the 1992 Summer Olympics
Rowers at the 1996 Summer Olympics
Rowers at the 2000 Summer Olympics
Rowers at the 2004 Summer Olympics
Olympic silver medalists for Ukraine
Olympic medalists in rowing
Competitors stripped of Summer Olympics medals
Medalists at the 1996 Summer Olympics
Sportspeople from Dnipro
20th-century Ukrainian women